Moody Eason "Sonny" Stallings Jr. (born December 12, 1947) is an American attorney and former politician, who served as a member of the Virginia Senate. He was first elected in 1987, defeating incumbent A. Joe Canada Jr., but lost reelection in 1991 to Ken Stolle.

Stallings was wounded in action during the Vietnam War.

Electoral history

References

External links
 

1947 births
Living people
Old Dominion University alumni
University of Richmond School of Law alumni
Democratic Party Virginia state senators
Politicians from Suffolk, Virginia
20th-century American politicians